Iva Frühlingová (born 11 May 1982 in Litvínov, Czechoslovakia) is a Czech female singer and model, famous in the Czech Republic and France. Despite her Czech descent she sings mostly in French.

Biography 
Frühlingová was born in Litvínov, Czechoslovakia, now Czech Republic. When she was 14 years old she moved to Paris to work as a model. There she released her first album called Litvínov, in 2003. This album became popular in Czech Republic and even in France especially song Ou Tu Veux Quand Tu Veux. In 2004 she moved back to Prague where she did her second album – Baby Doll. In the fall of 2008 she released her third CD – Strip Twist.

Discography 
Albums

Litvínov (2003)
 Où tu veux, quand tu veux (radio edit)
 La muerte
 Tu me manques
 J'ai eu tort
 Alice
 It ain't easy
 Vanity Case
 Quitte à tout refaire
 Nos moments intimes
 Nue sous le soleil
 Utíkám
 3 p'tits points de suspicion
 Où tu veux, quand tu veux (album version)
Baby Doll (2005)
 Intro
 Latinka
 Une histoire sans fin
 Harley Davidson (de Serge Gainsbourg)
 Virtuoses en voltige
 Babydoll
 Věřím
 Skládám
 Je te préfère nue
 A part
 Les petites morsures
 Jamais
 Ta moje
Strip Twist (2007)
 Les loukoums
 Waterbed (G pa l'mec)
 Partir et revenir
 Strip Twist
 La chanson de Pierre (avec Pierre Richard)
 Night Reflections
 Mekess kidizz
 Animální hlavolam
 Struny
 Le crabe
 L'échéance
 Je n'sais pas si
 Doma nejlíp s No Pan!c (2010)
 Retrospektive BEST OF (2010)
 Chic á Paris (2013)

Singles 

 Où tu veux, quand tu veux (Litvinov)
 La Muerte (Litvinov)
 J'ai eu tort (Litvinov)
 D part (Baby Doll)
 I Believe (Baby Doll)
 Waterbed (Strip Twist)
 La Chanson De Pierre – The single was sung with French actor Pierre Richard
 I do not address (At home best)
 Hey Hey Hey (Chic & Paris)

References

External links
 Iva Frühlingová official webpage (Czech)
 
 Artist information on last.fm
 

1982 births
Living people
21st-century Czech women singers
People from Litvínov
Czech female models